Firefly Distillery is a company located near Park Circle North Charleston, South Carolina, that produces a line of alcoholic beverages and licenses its brand name to the Sazerac Company for Firefly branded products produced elsewhere. Some Firefly branded products sold outside of South Carolina are actually produced in Kentucky by Sazerac rather than being produced by Firefly itself.

Products

Firefly Muscadine Vodka
Firefly Distillery's first product was Firefly Muscadine Vodka. The vodka was introduced in April 2006, after an impromptu early March debut at Charleston International Antiques Show emceed by Martha Stewart gave the company unexpected attention.

The flavored vodka was inspired by the distillery's location on a vineyard. Muscadine grapes are native to the southeast region, and muscadine wine is traditionally a very sweet wine.  This product was originally produced in Florida due to South Carolina's distillery licensing fees issues.

Firefly earned 89 out of 100 points from the Beverage Testing Institute in Chicago, outscoring such industry standards as Absolut and Ketel One.

Firefly Sweet Tea Vodka
In April 2008 Firefly Sweet Tea Vodka was added to the product line. The product is a twist on the southern staple, sweet tea. The vodka is distilled on Wadmalaw Island and the tea is from Charleston Tea Plantation.

In 2013, the Distillery introduced Firefly Moonshine.  Moonshine Flavors include White Lightning, Apple Pie, Blackberry, Caramel, Cherry, Peach, Ruby Red and Strawberry.

Firefly Handcrafted Vodka
Firefly Handcrafted Vodka, a straight vodka product, was introduced to the market January 2009. This vodka is distilled slowly in batches six times. Currently this product is only distributed to South Carolina, but plans are to expand distribution.  The 2009 San Francisco World Spirits Competition awarded Firefly Handcrafted Vodka a bronze medal.

Firefly Sweet Tea Whiskey
Firefly Sweet Tea Whiskey is made with tea grown locally near the distillery.  It is only available in South Carolina.

Firefly Bourbon Ball Whiskey
Firefly Bourbon Ball Whiskey is a chocolate and pecan flavored whiskey.

Firefly Southern Lemonade
Firefly Southern Lemonade was released in April 2010 and is a part of Firefly's ready to drink collection. Firefly Southern Lemonade blends Firefly straight vodka with fresh squeezed lemonade.

Firefly Sweet Tea Lemonade
The Sweet Tea Lemonade is a blend of Firefly Sweet Tea Vodka and fresh squeezed lemonade.

Production by the Sazerac Company
In October 2008, Firefly Distillery and the Sazerac Company formed a joint venture to produce Firefly Sweet Tea Vodka at Sazerac's Buffalo Trace Distillery in Kentucky and distribute the product through Sazerac's distribution channels. Through this joint venture Firefly Sweet Tea Vodka was able to be distributed to all states by March 2009.

As of April 2016, the company's web site says that "Firefly products that are sold outside of South Carolina are made at our sister distilleries in Kentucky", and the Sazerac Company web site lists Firefly brand products in its brand portfolio.

References

American vodkas
Companies based in South Carolina
Distilleries in the United States
Food and drink companies based in South Carolina